In enzymology, an anthranilate 3-monooxygenase is an enzyme that catalyzes the chemical reaction

anthranilate + tetrahydrobiopterin + O2  3-hydroxyanthranilate + dihydrobiopterin + H2O

The 3 substrates of this enzyme are anthranilate, tetrahydrobiopterin, and O2, whereas its 3 products are 3-hydroxyanthranilate, dihydrobiopterin, and H2O.

This enzyme belongs to the family of oxidoreductases, specifically those acting on paired donors, with O2 as oxidant and incorporation or reduction of oxygen. The oxygen incorporated need not be derived from O2 with reduced pteridine as one donor, and incorporation of one ato of oxygen into the other donor.  The systematic name of this enzyme class is anthranilate,tetrahydrobiopterin:oxygen oxidoreductase (3-hydroxylating). Other names in common use include anthranilate 3-hydroxylase, anthranilate hydroxylase, anthranilic hydroxylase, and anthranilic acid hydroxylase.  This enzyme participates in tryptophan metabolism.  It employs one cofactor, iron.

References

 
 

EC 1.14.16
Iron enzymes
Enzymes of unknown structure
Anthranilates